The Panamanian Athletics Federation (FEPAT; Federación Panameña de Atletismo) is the governing body for the sport of athletics in Panamá.  Current president is Mario Quintero who was elected in February 2019 for the period 2019-2022.

History
FEPAT was founded in 1945.

Affiliations
FEPAT is the national member federation for Panama in the following international organisations:
International Association of Athletics Federations (IAAF)
Confederación Sudamericana de Atletismo (CONSUDATLE; South American Athletics Confederation)
Association of Panamerican Athletics (APA)
Asociación Iberoamericana de Atletismo (AIA; Ibero-American Athletics Association)
Central American and Caribbean Athletic Confederation (CACAC)
Confederación Atlética del Istmo Centroamericano (CADICA; Central American Isthmus Athletic Confederation)
Moreover, it is part of the following national organisations:
Comité Olímpico de Panamá

Members
FEPAT comprises the provincial athletics leagues of Panamá.

National records
FEPAT maintains the Panamanian records in athletics.

References

External links
 
 IAAF web site

Panama
Athletics
Athletics in Panama
National governing bodies for athletics
Sports organizations established in 1945